Yōichi, Yoichi, Youichi or Yohichi is a masculine Japanese given name.

Possible writings
Yōichi can be written using different combinations of kanji characters. Some examples: 

洋一, "ocean, one"
陽一, "sunshine, one"
庸一, "common, one"
楊一, "willow, one"
耀一, "shine, one"
陽市, "sunshine, city"
耀市, "shine, city"
蓉一, "lotus, one"

The name can also be written in hiragana よういち or katakana ヨウイチ.

Notable people with the name
, Japanese footballer
, Japanese manga artist
, Japanese photographer
, Japanese footballer
, Japanese video game producer
, Japanese footballer
, Japanese film director
Yoichi Iha (伊波 洋一, born 1952), Japanese politician
, Japanese drifting driver
, Japanese footballer
, Japanese footballer
, Japanese volleyball player
, Japanese voice actor
, Japanese manga artist and animator
, Japanese academic
, Japanese environmentalist
, Japanese voice actor
, Japanese politician
, Japanese photographer
, Japanese mathematician
, Japanese politician
, Japanese footballer
, Japanese actor
Yoichi Okamoto (1915–1985), American photographer
, Japanese film director
, Japanese film director
, Japanese manga artist
, Japanese business theorist
, Japanese motorcycle racer
, Japanese chief executive

See also
5176 Yoichi, a main-belt asteroid

Japanese masculine given names